Henrik Lavonius (19 January 1915 – 31 January 1996) was a Finnish equestrian. He competed in two events at the 1952 Summer Olympics.

References

1915 births
1996 deaths
Finnish male equestrians
Olympic equestrians of Finland
Equestrians at the 1952 Summer Olympics
Sportspeople from Tampere